Lower Squankum is an unincorporated community located within Howell Township in Monmouth County, New Jersey, United States. The settlement is located along Lakewood-Farmingdale Road (County Route 547) at its intersection with Herbertsville Road (CR 549) and Old Tavern Road (CR 21) in the eastern side of the township. It is also located near the boundary of Allaire State Park and is south of Interstate 195's exit 31. Nearby the community are the remains of the Lower Squankum Mill and the Lower Squankum Friends Burial Site, located within the median of CR 547 at the aforementioned interchange.

See also
Squankum, New Jersey
List of place names of Native American origin in New Jersey

References

Neighborhoods in Howell Township, New Jersey
Unincorporated communities in Monmouth County, New Jersey
Unincorporated communities in New Jersey